Kent Smith is an Australian cinematographer and film producer, and founding partner of the Kojo group of companies.

Career
Smith began his career as a cinematographer in Australian Television with Seven Network Australia in 1972.

After more than a decade working in network television in Victoria and South Australia, where he won many national and international awards, Smith established his own Adelaide-based production company, Kent Smith Productions, in 1984.

He spent seven years working with some of Australia’s largest corporate clients, then in 1991 he expanded the business to form the Kojo Group, with the help of creative partners, John Chataway, Dale Roberts, Marty Pepper and, in 2002, Steve Wise.

In 2005, Smith took the Kojo Group into feature film production, starting with the film 2:37, which was an Official Selection at the 2006 Cannes Film Festival. His subsequent films include Beautiful, which earned an Australian Film Institute award nomination, and The Tree, which was also an Official Selection and the Closing Film at 2010 Cannes Film Festival.

Films
Smith’s film producing credits include:

See also
Cinema of Australia

References

External links
 
 Kent Smith at Official Kojo website

Australian film producers
Australian television producers
Living people
People from Adelaide
Year of birth missing (living people)